Juliari Peter Batubara (born 22 July 1972) is an Indonesian politician, who served as Minister of Social Affairs in the 41st Cabinet of Indonesia from 23 October 2019 until his arrest in December 2020 for alleged corruption. He is a member of the Indonesian Democratic Party of Struggle (PDI-P).

Education and business career 

 SD St Franciscus ASISI Tebet Jakarta, 1979 – 1985
 SMP St Franciscus ASISI Tebet Jakarta, 1985 – 1988
 SMAN 8 Tebet Jakarta, 1988 – 1991
 Riverside City College, United States, 1991 – 1995
 Business Administration degree with minor in Finance, Chapman University, United States, 1995 - 1997

Business career 
 President commissioner of PT Tridaya Mandiri, 2005.
 President director of PT Bwana Energy, 2004.
 President director of PT Arlinto Perkasa Buana, 2003.
 President director of PT Wiraswasta Gemilang Indonesia, 2003 – 2012.
 Commercial Division of PT Wiraswasta Gemilang Indonesia, 2002 – 2003.
 Marketing Supervisor of PT Wiraswasta Gemilang Indonesia, 1998 – 2002.

Political career 
Before entering politics, Juliari's business career involved companies such as PT Wiraswasta Gemilang Indonesia, PT Arlinto Perkasa Buana, PT Bwana Energy, and PT Tridaya Mandiri.

In 2014, he became a member of the People's Representative Council, representing Central Java for the Indonesian Democratic Party of Struggle. He joined the national parliament's Commission VI, which handles trade, industrial, investment and business affairs.

In October 2019, he was appointed Minister of Social Affairs by Indonesian President Joko Widodo. In December 2020, Widodo appointed Coordinating Minister for Human Development and Culture Muhadjir Effendy as acting social affairs minister, following Juliari's arrest for alleged corruption.

Corruption case 
On 6 December 2020, Juliari was arrested in Jakarta for allegedly receiving bribes from suppliers of social assistance during the COVID-19 pandemic. Indonesia's Corruption Eradication Commission (KPK) alleged that Juliari received up to IDR 17 billion in bribes. KPK chairman Firli Bahuri said Juliari is accused of receiving the bribes from two supplier companies via his two subordinates, Matheus Joko Santoso and Adi Wahyono, who were also named suspects. He said the suppliers had been asked to pay a commission fee of IDR 10,000, for Juliari, for each package of basic food worth IDR 300,000 distributed to the needy during economic hardships due to the pandemic crisis. Due to the severity of his alleged crime, Juliari could face life imprisonment or the death penalty if convicted.

In August 2021, he was sentenced to 11 years in jail.

References 

Living people
1972 births
Politicians from Jakarta
21st-century Indonesian politicians
Onward Indonesia Cabinet
Social affairs ministers of Indonesia
Indonesian Democratic Party of Struggle politicians
Indonesian politicians convicted of corruption